Favre-Leuba is a Swiss manufacturer of luxury wristwatches  headquartered in Zug, Switzerland, and formerly a pioneer in watch design, manufacturing and distribution. The foundation of the brand was laid in 1737 when Abraham Favre was registered as a watchmaker, so it has been reported as the second-oldest watch brand in Switzerland, after Blancpain (1735).

History 

An archival document states that Abraham Favre was a watchmaker with his own workshop on 13 March 1737. It was his son, also by the name of Abraham Favre, who turned his father's passion into a business. In 1792 Abraham Favre, along with his two sons, Frederic & Henry-Louis, founded the company A.Favre & Fils in Le Locle. From the very beginning Abraham Favre concentrated on improving the technology of his watches, their properties at different temperatures as well as the materials used in watchmaking, thus making more reliable and accurate movements.  

Henry-Augustus, Frederic Favre's son and Abraham Favre's grandson, expanded this family business into distant markets. This fourth generation Favre member collaborated with Auguste Leuba, a member of a family of watchmakers & merchants, to create the brand name Favre-Leuba in 1815. They traveled together across various  countries, from Germany to Russia, from Cuba to the United States, from Brazil to Chile and many more. The 19-year-old Henry-Augustus broadened this family business to the world market.

Fritz Favre, who married Adele-Fanny Leuba in 1855, took the business into many more countries across Europe, the Americas & Asia. He participated in various national and international exhibitions, such as the Universal Exhibition in London in 1851, the New York Fair in 1853, and also won many accolades for the brand. It was his children, part of the sixth generation of Favres, who worked towards strengthening the brand across various markets, especially when Europe was facing challenging times. India became a very important market for Favre-Leuba and this was the first Swiss company from the industry to have established itself in that country.

Henry A Favre, born in 1908, part of the seventh generation, continued to grow and develop the business by setting up offices and employing representatives across South America, Africa, the Middle-East, Far-East and European markets. He, along with his father & other predecessors from the sixth generation, was responsible for the launch of many iconic pieces as we know of today.

Around the year 1925, Favre-Leuba produced a single button chronograph and created the Reverso mechanism in 1940. It is under this team that the company made many distinguishing innovations, noteworthy being the FL101 movement manufactured in 1955. In 1957, they designed their automatic calibers, FL103 & 104.  The new FL251 caliber, an extra-flat, twin-barrel with a central second hand and a power reserve of 50 hours was launched in 1962.

In 1962, the hand winding wristwatch, Bivouac, which was the first ever mechanical watch with altimeter & aneroid barometer was launched. Paul-Emile Victor was one of the first to wear this piece during his Antarctica expedition while Michel Vaucher & Walter Bonatti used it while summiting the Grandes Jorasses in the Alps.

1964 experienced another grand launch, one of the first ever dive watches, Deep Blue, water resistant up to 200m. It was this same distinguished team which was also responsible for the launch of the famous Bathy in 1968, the first mechanical watch that not only indicated the dive time and duration but also accurately measured the dive depth.

In 1968, Favre-Leuba added an automatic winding to its innovative double-barrel calibers, making it one of the first brands to use this combination in series production. The new movements were available with or without calendar function.

Florian A Favre & Eric A Favre, sons of Henry A Favre along with Frederic A Favre, grandson of Fritz-Augustus Favre, represented the eight generation. They were the Board of Directors of Favre-Leuba, until the management of the company passed out of the hands of the  family.

The challenge brought about by the relatively inexpensive quartz movement introduced in 1969 greatly increased competition for the company's comparatively expensive mechanical watches.

As a result, the family sold the company, which passed through different hands such as Benedom SA and LVMH. 

On 16 November 2011, Titan Company Limited, the watch manufacturing company of the Tata Group, acquired the  brand Favre-Leuba.

In 2007, Favre-Leuba returned to the watch industry with the launch of three new models: The Mercury Collection.

After the subsequent sale to the Titan Group in 2011, they then released new collections of watches in 2016, their Raider and Chief Collections, led by their flagship model, the Raider Harpoon.

At BaselWorld 2017 they unveiled a new addition to Favre-Leuba's Raider Collection, The Raider Bivouac 9000. The only watch to measure altitude to 9000m mechanically, the Raider Bivouac 9000 was awarded the best watch in the New Star category by WatchStars. The 70 member jury comprising watch expert, journalists, collectors chose 35 watches and of this voted for the New Star 2018 winner.

In 2017, Favre-Leuba supported many athletes and explorers who hold true and express the brand claim, Conquering Frontiers. Arctic Mission led by Pen Hadow was one such association, wherein Pen Hadow - the explorer - and the brand, believe the need to show to the world the fragile environment that exists in the Central Arctic Ocean, particularly around the North Pole, so that the adequate measures can be formulated to protect this special geographic habitat.

Favre-Leuba also became a partner of Satyarup Siddhanta who is only the fifth Indian to have climbed the 7 summits, the last of which was with the Bivouac 9000 on his wrist as a valuable tool and guide. After the expedition Paul-Emile Victor completed in 1962 in the Antarctica with the Bivouac from that year, Favre-Leuba once again demonstrated the technical brilliance and utility of its tool watch in the same region nearly 55 years later with the latest Bivouac 900, a watch even more ingenious than its predecessor. 

The brand today has also collaborated with Adrian Ballinger and Emily Harrington who are professional mountaineers and will be using the Raider Bivouac 9000 in their challenging expeditions in the year 2018. Ralph Weber, Nicolas Hojac, and Ricardo Feller are also three Swiss athletes, each a master in their chosen sport, who are partners of the brand for they demonstrate the conquering frontiers spirit with each of their ventures.

In Japan, Favre-Leuba ambassador Sayuri Kinoshita has broken the world record of a constant no fin dive while Taisuke Kusunoki represents the brand in the sport of free ride skiing. 

2018 is a year that marks the 50th anniversary of the Bathy launched in 1968. This dive instrument was the first to display dive depth using a central hand. The brand pays homage to this namesake with the Raider Bathy 120 MemoDepth, which measures and displays depth down to 120m, more than double of the original Bathy.

On 20 May 2018, Adrian Ballinger and his team summited Mount Everest with an instrument watch designed for such adventures, the Raider Bivouac 9000. On top of the world, it proved to work perfectly, without letting the harsh weather and temperatures of -40 degrees and below affecting it. With this expedition, the Raider Bivouac 9000 created a new record as the only mechanical wrist watch equipped with an aneroid barometer, to work perfectly on Mount Everest, the roof of the world.

Timeline 

1925: Developed the single button Chronograph wristwatch
1946: Developed an 18 carat, gold, manual winding wristwatch with triple calendar
1955: Production of a gold chronograph watch with calendar,  moon phase, 30-minute and 12-hour counters
1955: Developed the FL 101 movement
1956: Developed the Sea King and Sea Chief models
1957: Launch of Datic wristwatches with FL 102 caliber and the Daymatic with automatic calibers FL103 and FL104
1960: Developed one of the first dive watches, Water Deep
1962: Developed the FL251, extra thin (2.95mm), twin barrel calibre with 50-hour power reserve
1962: Developed the Bivouac, first ever altimeter / barometer wristwatch
1964: Developed Deep Blue, water resistant  to 200meters
1965: FL251 twin power calibre developed and launch of Sea King model
1966: Developed the first diving chronograph wristwatch
1968: Development of the model Bathy, first ever wristwatch with depth or pressure gauge for divers
1968: Automatic winding for double-barrel calibers
1968: Developed the Harpoon watch model
2017: The  280th anniversary with the Raider Bivouac 9000,    instrument for use at high altitudes 
2018: Raider Bivouac 9000 wins the Watchstars award in the category "New Stars" for being the best new watch in 2018
2018: Favre-Leuba celebrates the 50th anniversary of the 1968 superstar Bathy, with the Raider Bathy 120 MemoDepth, which measures and records depth to 120m
2018: the Raider Bivouac 9000, reaches the summit of Mount Everest. The Bivouac 9000 is the only mechanical altimeter watch in the world to have successfully reached the altitude of 8848m, fulfilling its design objective

References

External links
Ariel Adams, Favre-Leuba Raider Harpoon Watch With Slick Way Of Showing The Time ablogtowatch.com FEB 13, 2017 

Watch manufacturing companies of Switzerland
1737 establishments in Europe
Diving accessory equipment
Swiss watch brands
Titan Company